Eleonora Pons Maronese (born June 25, 1996), better known as Lele Pons, is a Venezuelan-American YouTuber, actress, and singer.

Pons came to prominence on Vine before the platform shut down in 2016 where she was the most followed woman and the 3rd most followed viner with 11.5 million followers. She then expanded into creating comedy sketches for YouTube, where she has over 17 million subscribers as of December 2022. She has since acted in film, television, and music videos; released her own music; and co-authored a novel. She currently stars in The Secret Life of Lele Pons, a YouTube Original docuseries providing a look at her personal life, and hosts a podcast on Spotify called Best Kept Secrets with Lele Pons.

Early life
Eleonora Pons Maronese was born in Caracas on June 25, 1996, the daughter of pediatrician Ana Maronese Pivetta and architect Luis Guillermo Pons Mendoza. When she was a child, her parents separated after her father realized that he was gay. She is of Italian and Venezuelan descent, and is the niece of Puerto Rican singer Chayanne. She moved to the U.S. at the age of five and was raised in Miami. She graduated from Miami Country Day School in 2015 and moved to Los Angeles. She has said that she had trouble making friends in high school and would thus "get hurt to make them laugh". She has also described being bullied in high school: "I'm not like the cool girls—I'm the other girl. The one that's basically a nerd, but proud of that."

Career

Pons began her career on the video platform Vine. She has said she used Vine to showcase the creative things she was already doing. Speaking to Teen Vogue, Pons said, "I started with my friends, and I started becoming bad. At first it was just being really creative - it wasn't even funny stuff." Her follower base continued to grow and Pons has said that it "got to the point where a lot of people depended on me to make them... just so they could get a laugh." She became the first "Viner" to reach one billion loops.

Writing in The Cut, Allie Jones described Pons' comedy as "universal, physical, and complete with a twist ending". Pons' comedic style has also been criticised. For instance, former Viner, Cody Ko, critically viewed one her sketches, saying, "This was written by a four-year-old." Pons cites, among her inspirations, several Latin American female stars such as Sofía Vergara, Gaby Espino, and Shakira. In 2016, she was signed with entertainment company Shots Studios.

Pons is managed by John Shahidi of Shots Podcast Network.

Pons has used her success in Internet comedy to launch a number of enterprises. In 2015, she launched a jewelry collection called UNO Magnetic. In 2016, Pons co-authored a novel based on her own high school experiences, Surviving High School, co-authored with Melissa de la Cruz. Pons starred as Callie in the 2016 romantic comedy We Love You, released on YouTube Red. In the movie, characters played by Yousef Erakat and Justin Dobies both fall for Pons, who is "cool enough" to date both of them at the same time. The movie was produced by YouTube and AwesomenessTV.

Pons appeared in the first episode of MTV's horror TV series, Scream, in which she was the season's first victim of Ghostface. She has starred in a number of music videos, including "Havana" by Camila Cabello, and "Downtown" by Anitta and J Balvin. In May 2018, Pons released her debut single, a Spanish-language duet with Matt Hunter titled "Dicen". The YouTube music video amassed 10 million views in just four days. Pons has also had success in modelling.

In February 2017, she became a brand ambassador for CoverGirl. The same month, Pons walked in a Dolce & Gabbana show in Milan. Babe criticised the move as seeming "a bit hackneyed and past-it". In August, Pons released her first single and music video for her song "Celoso", which was directed by fellow creator Rudy Mancuso. The song was certified 10× Diamond and earned a nomination for the Premios Lo Nuestro nomination for the video.

On March 29, 2019, Lele released her English-language debut, and her first country song with the Jake Owen duet "Señorita" from his album Greetings from... Jake.

Pons took over hosting of La Voz... México on October 14, 2018. She presented the 19th Annual Latin Grammy Awards with Aitana.

On December 6, 2019, Pons released her new single and music video "Vete Pa La". The music video was self-directed and edited by Pons and produced by Shots Studios.

In December 2019, Pons was a co-host on the red carpet alongside Chelsea Briggs for the 2019 Billboard Women in Music.

Pons was a guest speaker at the 2020 CES conference held in Las Vegas. As a digital media mogul and global entertainer, Pons was asked to be a speaker on the Spotify panel alongside Spotify's Chief Content Officer Dawn Ostroff. She talked about how Spotify revolutionized music and impacted her career and how she plans on using that same model for her upcoming podcast with Spotify.

On August 19, 2020, Pons released the first episode of Best Kept Secrets with Lele Pons, a podcast on Spotify in which anonymous callers share "eyebrow raising experiences they don't dare share with friends and family".

Pons received the Women's Entrepreneurship Day Organization’s Influencer Pioneer Award at the United Nations in 2022, celebrating her as a trailblazer and innovator in her field. The prestigious award, also recognized by the US Congress, highlights women entrepreneurs and the meaningful impact they are having on the world. Also in 2022, Pons competed in season four of ¿Quién es la máscara? as "Pulpo" (which is Spanish for "Octopus"). She was the first to be eliminated.

In 2023, Pons competed in season nine of The Masked Singer as "Jackalope". She was eliminated on "Sesame Street Night" alongside Malin Akerman as "Squirrel".

Personal life
Although Pons was raised in Miami from the age of five, she remained solely a Venezuelan citizen until acquiring US citizenship at the age of 23.

Pons began dating Puerto Rican rapper Guaynaa in December 2020, they got engaged in August 2022 and married on 4 March 2023.

Pons suffers from Tourette syndrome and severe obsessive-compulsive disorder.

Filmography

Films

Television

Music videos

Discography

Singles

Notes

Awards and nominations

References

External links
 
 
 
 Lele Pons on Spotify
 Lele Pons hosts Venezuela Aid Live – YouTube from La Nación

1996 births
Living people
21st-century American women singers
American actresses
American YouTubers
Comedy YouTubers
Hispanic and Latino American actresses
Miami Country Day School alumni
Music YouTubers
People from Caracas
People from Miami
People with obsessive–compulsive disorder
People with Tourette syndrome
Prank YouTubers
Spanish-language singers of the United States
Venezuelan emigrants to the United States
Venezuelan people of Catalan descent
Venezuelan people of Italian descent
 Venezuelan people of Spanish descent
Venezuelan YouTubers
Vine (service) celebrities